Alceu may refer to:

Given name
 Alceu Amoroso Lima (1893–1983), Brazilian 
 Alceu Ribeiro (1919–2013), Uruguayan painter and sculptor
 Alceu Collares (born 1927), Brazilian politician and lawyer
 Alceu Valença (born 1946), Brazilian singer, musician and songwriter
 Alceu Feldmann (born 1972), Brazilian racing driver
 Alceu (footballer) (born 1984), Alceu Rodrigues Simoni Filho, Brazilian footballer

Places
 Alceu (river), tributary of the Crișul Repede river, Romania